Joseph or Joe Clarke may refer to:

Sports
 Joe Clarke (canoeist) (born 1992), British slalom canoeist
 Joe Clarke (cricketer) (born 1996), English cricketer
 Joe Clarke (Galway hurler) (born 1952), Irish retired hurler
 Joe Clarke (soccer) (born 1953), former U.S. soccer defender and collegiate soccer coach
 Joe Clarke (Westmeath hurler) (born 1986), Irish hurler

Politics and government
 Joseph Clarke (Canadian politician) (1869–1941), Canadian politician and lawyer
 Joseph Clarke (Kentucky politician) (born 1933), American politician
 Joe Clarke (Irish republican) (1882–1976), Irish republican activist
 Joseph Calvitt Clarke Jr. (1920–2004), United States federal judge

Other
 Joseph Clarke (priest) (died 1749), English controversialist
 Joseph Clarke (architect) (died 1888), British Gothic Revival architect
 Joseph Augustine Clarke (1844–1890), Queensland artist, painter, journal illustrator and arts-teacher
Joseph I. C. Clarke (1846–1927), Irish-American journalist, playwright, and poet

See also 
 Joseph Clark (disambiguation)